The Vietnam men's national volleyball team is the volleyball national team of Vietnam, representing Vietnam in international volleyball competitions and friendly matches.

Results

World Championship 
 2014 — Did not qualify
   2018 — Did not qualify

Asian Championship
 Champions   Runners up   Third place   Fourth place

Asian Cup
 Champions   Runners up   Third place   Fourth place

Asian Games 
 Champions   Runners up   Third place   Fourth place

Southeast Asian Games
 Champions   Runners up   Third place   Fourth place

Lien Viet Post Bank Volleyball Cup
 2018 — 3rd place
 2019

Current squad 
The following is the Vietnam roster in the men's volleyball tournament of the 2018 Asian Games.

Head coach: Phùng Công Hưng

See also
 Vietnam women's national volleyball team
 Volleyball Vietnam League

References

External links
 Official website
 Youtube
 FIVB profile

National men's volleyball teams
Volleyball
Volleyball in Vietnam
Men's sport in Vietnam